Hugh Jocelyn McGrath (April 6, 1856 – November 7, 1899) was a captain in the United States Army and a Medal of Honor recipient for his actions in the Philippine–American War.

He graduated from the United States Military Academy in 1880. He lived in Eau Claire, Wisconsin. He was wounded in the left thigh at Noveleta in October 1899, and he died of his wound a month later. His body was repatriated in December 1899 and he was buried at Arlington National Cemetery.

Medal of Honor citation
Rank and organization: Captain, 4th U.S. Cavalry. Place and date: At Calamba, Luzon, Philippine Islands, July 26, 1899. Entered service at: Eau Claire, Wis. Birth: Fond du Lac, Wis. Date of issue: April 29, 1902.

Citation:

Swam the San Juan River in the face of the enemy's fire and drove him from his entrenchments.

See also
List of Medal of Honor recipients
List of Philippine–American War Medal of Honor recipients

References

External links
 

1856 births
1899 deaths
United States Military Academy alumni
United States Army Medal of Honor recipients
United States Army officers
People from Eau Claire, Wisconsin
People from Fond du Lac, Wisconsin
American military personnel killed in the Philippine–American War
Military personnel from Wisconsin
Philippine–American War recipients of the Medal of Honor